Lucas Giuliano Passerini (born 16 July 1994) is an Argentine professional footballer who plays for Unión La Calera as a centre-forward.

Career
Passerini got underway with Quilmes in 2014. His debut appearance for Quilmes arrived on 8 August 2014, he played fourteen minutes of a Primera División match with Rosario Central; which was one of two appearances he made for the club. In January 2015, Comunicaciones in Primera B Metropolitana loaned Passerini. He netted his first goal in his second game for Comunicaciones, on 14 March versus Deportivo Merlo. Overall, he scored three goals in twenty-two fixtures. 2016 saw Passerini sign for fellow Primera B Metropolitana team Estudiantes. He scored on his starting debut vs. UAI Urquiza.

On 22 July 2017, following eleven goals in thirty-four games in 2016–17 for Estudiantes, Passerini joined Tigre on loan. Five appearances in the Argentine Primera División followed. In January 2018, Sarmiento became Passerini's fifth club as he signed on loan until the end of the 2017–18 Primera B Nacional campaign. Seven months later, Paraguayan Primera División side Guaraní completed the loan signing of Passerini on 8 July. He made his bow against Libertad on 12 August, which was one of eight matches he featured in as they placed eighth to qualify for the 2019 Copa Sudamericana.

In January 2019, Passerini switched Paraguay for Chile by agreeing terms with Palestino. Passerini netted a hat-trick in the Chilean Primera División versus Audax Italiano on 18 August 2019, which made it six goals in his last three matches and his eleventh goal in twenty-four total games. Another hat-trick arrived on 6 October versus Curicó Unido, in between strikes against Coquimbo Unido and Cobresal. January 2020 saw Passerini head to Liga MX with Cruz Azul. He wouldn't score in four 2019–20 matches, though did net home and away in the CONCACAF Champions League versus Portmore United.

June 2020 saw Passerini agree twelve-month loan terms with fellow Mexican top-flight team Necaxa. He scored on his home debut against América on 7 August, before netting on his next appearance versus Mazatlán on 12 August. Passerini's loan was cut short at the end of December, with the centre-forward subsequently agreeing a move to Atlético San Luis ahead of January 2021.

Personal life
From his maternal line, he is of Chilean descent, due to the fact that his grandmother was born to a Chilean parents. So, he has stated his desire to acquire the Chilean nationality.

Career statistics
.

Honours
Cruz Azul
 Campeón de Campeones: 2021

References

External links

1994 births
Living people
People from Formosa, Argentina
Argentine sportspeople of Chilean descent
Argentine footballers
Association football forwards
Argentine expatriate footballers
Expatriate footballers in Paraguay
Expatriate footballers in Chile
Expatriate footballers in Mexico
Argentine expatriate sportspeople in Paraguay
Argentine expatriate sportspeople in Chile
Argentine expatriate sportspeople in Mexico
Argentine Primera División players
Primera B Metropolitana players
Primera Nacional players
Paraguayan Primera División players
Chilean Primera División players
Liga MX players
Quilmes Atlético Club footballers
Club Comunicaciones footballers
Estudiantes de Buenos Aires footballers
Club Atlético Tigre footballers
Club Atlético Sarmiento footballers
Club Guaraní players
Club Deportivo Palestino footballers
Cruz Azul footballers
Club Necaxa footballers
Atlético San Luis footballers